Crangonyx gracilis, the northern lake crangonyctid, is a species of amphipod in the family Crangonyctidae. It is found in North America.

References

Gammaridea
Articles created by Qbugbot
Crustaceans described in 1871